Nebulin is an actin-binding protein which is localized to the thin filament of the sarcomeres in skeletal muscle. Nebulin in humans is coded for by the gene NEB. It is a very large protein (600–900 kDa) and binds as many as 200 actin monomers. Because its length is proportional to thin filament length, it is believed that nebulin acts as a thin filament "ruler" and regulates thin filament length during sarcomere assembly and acts as the coats the actin filament.  Other functions of nebulin, such as a role in cell signaling, remain uncertain.

Nebulin has also been shown to regulate actin-myosin interactions by inhibiting ATPase activity in a calcium-calmodulin sensitive manner.

Mutations in nebulin cause some cases of the autosomal recessive disorder nemaline myopathy.

A smaller member of the nebulin protein family, termed nebulette, is expressed in cardiac muscle.

Structure 

The structure of the SH3 domain of nebulin was determined by protein nuclear magnetic resonance spectroscopy. The SH3 domain from nebulin is composed of 60 amino acid residues, of which 30 percent is in the beta sheet secondary structure (7 strands; 18 residues).

Knockout phenotype 

As of 2007, two knockout mouse models for nebulin have been developed to better understand its in vivo function.  Bang and colleagues demonstrated that nebulin-knockout mice die postnatally, have reduced thin filament length, and impaired contractile function.  Postnatal sarcomere disorganization and degeneration occurred rapidly in these mice, indicating the nebulin is essential for maintaining the structural integrity of myofibrils.  Witt and colleagues had similar results in their mice, which also died postnatally with reduced thin filament length and contractile function.  These nebulin-knockout mice are being investigated as animal models of nemaline myopathy.

References

Further reading

External links 
 
  GeneReviews/NCBI/NIH/UW entry on Nemaline Myopathy
 PDBe-KB provides an overview of all the structure information available in the PDB for Human Nebulin

Proteins